A tribute is wealth that one party gives to another as a sign of respect, submission, or allegiance. 

Tribute may also refer to:

Media and entertainment 
 Tribute (play), a 1978 play by Bernard Slade
 Tribute (1980 film), a Canadian film adaptation of the play
 Tribute, a 2008 novel by Nora Roberts
 Tribute (2009 film), an American television film adaptation of the book
 Tribute (ballet), a 2005 ballet by Christopher d'Amboise
 Tribute (magazine), a Canadian entertainment industry magazine
 Tribute FM, an English-language radio station targeting a Libyan audience
 "Tribute" (Arrow), a 2017 television episode
 "The Tribute" (Tales of the Unexpected), a 1983 television episode
 Tribute, a Hunger Games contestant in the Hunger Games franchise

Music 
 Tribute act, a musical act that performs songs and mimics the style of the original act
 Tribute album, a collection of cover versions of a specific artist's songs
 Tribute Records, an American record label

Albums
 Tribute (Emilie-Claire Barlow album), 2001
 Tribute (John Newman album), 2013
 Tribute (Keith Jarrett album), 1990
 Tribute (Ozzy Osbourne album), 1987
 Tribute (Paul Motian album), 1974
 Tribute (Roy Rogers album), 1991
 Tribute (Yanni album), 1997
 Tribute: Maison de M-Flo, a tribute album to M-Flo, 2009

Songs
 "Tribute" (song), by Tenacious D, 2001
 "Tribute (Right On)", by the Pasadenas, 1988

Products and businesses 
 Tribute (ticket), a British Rail ticketing software system
 Tribute Ale, a UK ale made by St Austell Brewery
 Tribute Games, a Canadian video game developer
 Tribute Power Station, Tasmania, Australia
 Firebird Tribute, a 2000s German paraglider design
 Mazda Tribute, a 2000–2011 compact SUV
 Tribute (website), an American video-sharing website

See also
 :Category:Musical tributes
 
 
 Homage (arts), a form of tribute in the arts